Tremmell Lequincy Dushun Darden (born December 17, 1981) is an American professional basketball player for Mitteldeutscher BC of the German Basketball Bundesliga.

High school career
Darden played high school basketball at Las Vegas High School, in Las Vegas, Nevada.

College career
Darden played college basketball at Niagara University, where he played with the Niagara Purple Eagles, from 2000 to 2004. He was named to the All-Metro Atlantic Athletic Conference 2nd Team, in both 2003 and 2004.

Professional career
Darden began his professional career in Turkey, in the 2004–05 season, with Erdemirspor. He then moved to the Belgian club Leuven Bears, where he spent the 2005–06 season. From 2006 to 2008, Darden played with Spirou Charleroi of Belgium. With Charleroi, he won the Belgian League championship, in the 2007–08 season.

In 2008, Darden signed with the South Dragons of Australia's NBL league. With the Dragons, he won the 2008–09 NBL season.

In August 2009, he signed a one-year deal with Strasbourg IG of France's LNB Pro A. In 2010, he was named a French League Foreign Players All-Star. In July 2010, he signed a one-year deal with another French team, SLUC Nancy Basket. Over the two-year period that he spent with the French teams, he was twice named the French League Player of the Month: (Dec. 2010, Feb. 2011).

In August 2011, he signed a one-year deal with the Spanish club Unicaja Málaga, of the Liga ACB.

On July 20, 2012, Darden signed a one-year deal with Žalgiris Kaunas of Lithuania's LKL league. On March 11, 2013, he left Žalgiris. Two days later, he signed with the Spanish EuroLeague club, Real Madrid, for the rest of the season. In July 2013, he extended his contract with Real Madrid for one more season.

In July 2014, Darden signed a two-year deal with Olympiacos, of Greece's Greek Basket League. On June 24, 2015, he parted ways with Olympiacos.

On September 12, 2015, he signed a one-year contract with the Turkish team Beşiktaş, of the BSL league.

On September 14, 2016, Darden signed with Italian club Pallacanestro Cantù, of the LBA league, for the 2016–17 LBA season.

Darden played for Mitteldeutscher BC of the Basketball Bundesliga during the 2019–20 season. He parted ways with the team on July 21, 2020.

On October 15, 2020, he has signed with Riesen Ludwigsburg of the Basketball Bundesliga. Darden averaged 7.3 points and 2.9 rebounds per game. He re-signed with the team on September 8, 2021.

On August 21, 2022, he has signed with Mitteldeutscher BC of the German Basketball Bundesliga.

Career statistics

EuroLeague

|-
| style="text-align:left;"| 2011–12
| style="text-align:left;"| Unicaja
| 10 || 10 || 26.4 || .429 || .333 || .783 || 3.5 || .8 || .3 || .9 || 8.3 || 7.2
|-
| style="text-align:left;"| 2012–13
| style="text-align:left;"| Žalgiris
| 20 || 19 || 24.2 || .633 || .517 || .724 || 3.9 || .8 || .5 || .2 || 9.9 || 11.1
|-
| style="text-align:left;"| 2013–14
| style="text-align:left;"| Real Madrid
| 31 || 30 || 20.0 || .459 || .464 || .720 || 2.6 || .8 || .3 || .5 || 5.7 || 6.2
|-
| style="text-align:left;"| 2014–15
| style="text-align:left;"| Olympiacos
| 27 || 26 || 15.7 || .387 || .265 || .783 || 1.8 || .5 || .5 || .4 || 4.2 || 3.5
|- class="sortbottom"
| style="text-align:left;"| Career
| style="text-align:left;"|
| 87 || 85 || 20.6 || .486 || .410 || .750 || 2.7 || .7 || .4 || .5 || 6.5 || 6.7

References

External links
 Tremmell Darden at acb.com 
 Tremmell Darden at esake.gr 
 Tremmell Darden at eurobasket.com
 Tremmell Darden at euroleague.net
 Tremmell Darden at draftexpress.com
 Tremmell Darden at fiba.com (game center)
 Tremmell Darden at fibaeurope.com
 Tremmell Darden at legabasket.it 
 Tremmell Darden at myhoopjourney.com
 Tremmell Darden at twitter.com

1981 births
Living people
American expatriate basketball people in Australia
American expatriate basketball people in Belgium
American expatriate basketball people in France
American expatriate basketball people in Germany
American expatriate basketball people in Italy
American expatriate basketball people in Lithuania
American expatriate basketball people in Spain
American expatriate basketball people in Turkey
American men's basketball players
Baloncesto Málaga players
Basketball players from Inglewood, California
BC Žalgiris players
Beşiktaş men's basketball players
Erdemirspor players
Lega Basket Serie A players
Leuven Bears players
Liga ACB players
Mitteldeutscher BC players
Niagara Purple Eagles men's basketball players
Olympiacos B.C. players
Pallacanestro Cantù players
Real Madrid Baloncesto players
Riesen Ludwigsburg players
Shooting guards
SIG Basket players
SLUC Nancy Basket players
Small forwards
South Dragons players
Spirou Charleroi players